Jim Butler (born February 15, 1971) is an American table tennis player. He competed at the 1992 Summer Olympics and the 1996 Summer Olympics.

References

External links
 

1971 births
Living people
American male table tennis players
Olympic table tennis players of the United States
Table tennis players at the 1992 Summer Olympics
Table tennis players at the 1996 Summer Olympics
Sportspeople from Iowa City, Iowa
Pan American Games medalists in table tennis
Pan American Games silver medalists for the United States
Pan American Games bronze medalists for the United States
Table tennis players at the 1987 Pan American Games
Table tennis players at the 1991 Pan American Games
Table tennis players at the 1995 Pan American Games
Medalists at the 1987 Pan American Games
Medalists at the 1991 Pan American Games
Medalists at the 1995 Pan American Games
20th-century American people